"Hillbilly Highway" is a song co-written and recorded by American singer-songwriter Steve Earle.  It was released in March 1986 as the first single from the album Guitar Town.  The song reached #37 on the Billboard Hot Country Singles & Tracks chart.  The song was written by Earle and Jimbeau Hinson.

Chart performance

References

1986 singles
1986 songs
Songs written by Steve Earle
Songs written by Jimbeau Hinson
Song recordings produced by Tony Brown (record producer)
Song recordings produced by Emory Gordy Jr.
MCA Records singles